Nishioka Dam  is a rockfill dam located in Hokkaido Prefecture in Japan. The dam is used for flood control and water supply. The catchment area of the dam is 4.5 km2. The dam impounds about 9  ha of land when full and can store 844 thousand cubic meters of water. The construction of the dam was started on 1993 and completed in 2009.

References

Dams in Hokkaido